Leap of Faith : Memoirs of an Unexpected Life (2003) is a book written by Queen Noor of Jordan, wife of the late Jordanian King Hussein I. Sharing a personal perspective on the past three decades of world history, Leap of Faith highlights Queen Noor's views on Islam and the West; the challenges of rearing her family; her work as Queen and humanitarian activist; and her struggles to protect her husband as he slipped into the illness that would kill him in 1999. Her story is filled with recollections of the world's most powerful and interesting people: Queen Elizabeth, Jimmy Carter, Pierre Trudeau, Ted Turner, Sean Connery, Richard Branson, Yassar Arafat and Anwar Sadat. She wrote this story after his death, describing her own life before and during their marriage, describing most of the political crisis he went through, including Black September.

External Links

2003 non-fiction books
Books about Jordan
Biographies about royalty
Political autobiographies
Hussein of Jordan